USS Java may refer to the following ships of the United States Navy:

 , a 44-gun frigate in service from 1815 until 1842
 Java, the name assigned to a screw sloop-of-war begun by the New York Navy Yard in 1863 but never completed; hulk was broken up in 1884

United States Navy ship names